The Linnaistensuo Mire is a nature reserve in Lahti, Finland. Linnaistensuo is a typical southern Finnish raised bog. It is located in the Kujala area near Linnaistenmäki, 7 kilometers from the city centre of Lahti.

Linnaistensuo is an area of 200 hectares. It contains 15 different natural mire types and the average peat in Linnaistensuo is 2.9 metres deep. A boardwalk trail, 1,5 kilometers, crosses the area. Linnaistensuo is also a popular destination for short hikes.

At Linnaistensuo the ditches have been blocked and there was a project to restore the natural state of the nature between the years 2002–2004. In the first phase, 100 hectares were protected and later the protected area has been supplemented.  Thanks to the new areas last added in 2003, nature reserve is now around 200 ha.

Linnaistensuo was accepted into the European Union's Natura 2000 network in 1998 as a representative sample of the raised bog nature in southern Finland.

External links
 Photos of Linnaistensuo

References

Lahti
Natura 2000 in Finland
Protected areas of Finland